Joel Iyiegbuniwe (born October 12, 1995) is an American football linebacker for the Carolina Panthers of the National Football League (NFL). He played college football at Western Kentucky.

Early years
Iyiegbuniwe attended South Warren High School in Bowling Green, Kentucky. Although as a senior he only played in four games, he tallied 23 tackles and one interception along with six touchdowns. As a junior he made 64 tackles with three interceptions along with four touchdowns. Iyiegbuniwe committed to play football for the Western Kentucky Hilltoppers in December 2013, choosing them over Indiana State and Southern Illinois.

College career
As a true freshman in 2014, Iyiegbuniwe played in the first three games of Western Kentucky's season before a knee injury ended his season. He elected to take a medical redshirt.

In 2015, as a redshirt freshman, Iyiegbuniwe played in all 14 of Western Kentucky's games, recording 19 tackles and one sack.

In 2016, Iyiegbuniwe, now a redshirt sophomore, once again appeared in all 14 games. He made 64 tackles (10 for loss), 3.5 sacks, three pass deflections and one forced fumble. He was awarded 2016 C-USA Honorable Mention.

As a redshirt junior in 2017, Iyiegbuniwe played in all 13 games, recording 117 tackles (11.5 for loss), two sacks, one pass deflection and three forced fumbles. He was named to the 2017 C-USA First-team. After the season, he declared for the 2018 NFL Draft.

Professional career

Chicago Bears

Iyiegbuniwe was drafted by the Chicago Bears in the fourth round (115th overall) of the 2018 NFL Draft.

Seattle Seahawks
On March 24, 2022, Iyiegbuniwe signed a one-year contract with the Seattle Seahawks. He was released on August 20, 2022.

Carolina Panthers
On October 20, 2022, Iyiegbuniwe was signed to the Carolina Panthers practice squad. He was promoted to the active roster on November 19.

Personal life
He is of Nigerian descent.

References

External links
Chicago Bears bio
Western Kentucky bio

1995 births
Living people
American sportspeople of Nigerian descent
Players of American football from Kentucky
American football linebackers
Western Kentucky Hilltoppers football players
People from Warren County, Kentucky
Chicago Bears players
Seattle Seahawks players
Carolina Panthers players